Webster Avenue is a major north–south thoroughfare in the Bronx, New York City, United States. The road starts at the intersection of Melrose Avenue, East 165th Street, Brook Avenue, and Park Avenue in the neighborhood of Melrose, ending at Nereid Avenue (East 238th Street) in the neighborhood of Woodlawn. There are no subway lines along this thoroughfare, unlike the streets it parallels—Jerome Avenue, The Grand Concourse, and White Plains Road, which all have subway lines (the IRT Jerome Avenue Line, IND Concourse Line, and IRT White Plains Road Line, respectively)—but until 1973, Webster Avenue north of Fordham Road was served by the Third Avenue Elevated, served by the 8 train.

Route description

Webster Avenue, which is wide for most of its length, begins as a continuation of Melrose Avenue at a large intersection with four roads including Melrose Avenue, East 165th Street, Brook Avenue, and Park Avenue. It begins in a northward direction, parallelling the Metro-North railroad tracks and Brook Avenue. At Claremont Parkway, the still parallel Brook Avenue comes to an end, and Webster Avenue continues north. At , the Cross Bronx Expressway passes over Webster Avenue. East Tremont Avenue (East 177th Street) intersects it soon afterward, in the eastern section of Tremont. Most of the southern half of Webster Avenue is concurrent with US 1.

Webster Avenue continues northerly by entering the eastern portion of the Fordham neighborhood. In Fordham, it forms a large intersection at Fordham Plaza with Decatur Avenue, East Fordham Road, and Third Avenue, across the street from Fordham University's Rose Hill campus. Decatur Avenue then parallels Webster Avenue on its west side as both roads continue north. Bedford Park Boulevard (East 200th Street) then intersects Webster Avenue in Bedford Park as it heads further north towards Woodlawn. Soon after the intersection with Bedford Park Boulevard (East 200th Street), Mosholu Parkway crosses over Webster Avenue, and then Gun Hill Road intersects it. Now parallel to the Bronx River Parkway, Webster Avenue then intersects with East 233rd Street, and finally ends at Nereid Avenue (East 238th Street) in northern Woodlawn, where it continues as Bronx River Road.

Transportation
The Metro-North Railroad's Harlem Line has several stations along Webster Avenue: Fordham station at Fordham Road; Botanical Garden station at Bedford Park Boulevard; and Williams Bridge station at Gun Hill Road. Additionally, the New York City Subway IRT Jerome Avenue Line, IND Concourse Line, and IRT White Plains Road Line, and the New York City Bus routes  serve the street.

Incidents
On March 29, 1936, a trolley on Webster Avenue crashed into a new automobile at 209th Street. The crash hurt 20 people, 12 of whom were rushed to Fordham Hospital.

Major intersections

References 

Streets in the Bronx
U.S. Route 1